Theydon Bois is a London Underground station in the village of Theydon Bois in Essex, England. It is served by the Central line and is between Debden and Epping, in Travelcard Zone 6.

History
The station was opened as "Theydon" by the Great Eastern Railway (GER) on 24 April 1865 but in December that year it was renamed to its present name.  It opened as an intermediate station on their Loughton–Ongar extension; the GER became part of the London and North Eastern Railway (LNER) in 1923. 'Milk trains' to Liverpool Street were a regular feature in the timetable until the underpass from Leyton to Stratford was built.

As part of the New Works Programme, 1935–1940, the LNER branch was transferred to London Underground, to form the part of the eastern extension of the Central line.

In 2015, advocacy by a local group forced a proposed 80-space commuter car park to seek planning permission before being constructed on land adjacent to the station.

The station today
The station was one of the first on the Underground network to operate without a staffed ticket office.

References

External links

 Home-Transport for London

Central line (London Underground) stations
Proposed Chelsea-Hackney Line stations
Tube stations in Essex
Transport in Epping Forest District
Former Great Eastern Railway stations
Railway stations in Great Britain opened in 1865